Orinthal D. "Andy" Anderson (November 11, 1920 – January 24, 1977) was an American baseball outfielder in the Negro leagues, Mexican League, and Minor League Baseball.

In 1946, he played for the Los Angeles White Sox and the Alijadores de Tampico, playing for Tampico again in 1948.

Anderson played with the Birmingham Black Barons in 1947.

From 1951 to 1957, he played for several minor league clubs, including in the Pittsburgh Pirates and Milwaukee Braves systems.

References

External links
 and  Seamheads

Birmingham Black Barons players
Alijadores de Tampico players
Los Angeles White Sox players
Carman Cardinals players
Salem Senators players
San Diego Padres (minor league) players
Denver Bears players
Lincoln Chiefs players
Minot Mallards players
1920 births
1977 deaths
Baseball players from Texas
People from Hillsboro, Texas
Baseball outfielders
20th-century African-American sportspeople
American expatriates in Mexico